Maxwell Steven Muncy (born August 25, 1990) is an American professional baseball infielder for the Los Angeles Dodgers of Major League Baseball (MLB). He played college baseball for the Baylor Bears. He was selected by the Oakland Athletics in the fifth round of the 2012 Major League Baseball draft. He played in MLB for the Athletics in 2015 and 2016, and later joined the Dodgers in 2018.

Career

Amateur career
Muncy attended Keller High School in Keller, Texas. The Cleveland Indians selected him in the 41st round of the 2009 Major League Baseball draft.

He did not sign with Cleveland and attended Baylor University. He played college baseball for the Baylor Bears from 2010 to 2012, and also played collegiate summer baseball for the Wareham Gatemen of the Cape Cod Baseball League in 2010 and 2011. In his three years at Baylor, Muncy had a .311 batting average with 27 home runs. He was twice chosen to the All-Big 12 Conference team.

Oakland Athletics

The Oakland Athletics selected Muncy in the fifth round of the 2012 Major League Baseball draft. He made his professional debut with the Burlington Bees of the Class A Midwest League, hitting .275/.383/.432 with four home runs in 64 games. He started the 2013 season with the Stockton Ports of the Class A-Advanced California League before being promoted to the Midland RockHounds of the Class AA Texas League. At the time of his promotion he was leading the California League with 21 home runs and 76 runs batted in (RBIs). In total, Muncy hit .273/.381/.476 with 25 home runs and 100 RBIs. After the season, he played for the Mesa Solar Sox of the Arizona Fall League. He returned to Midland in 2014.

Muncy began the 2015 season with the Nashville Sounds of the Class AAA Pacific Coast League (PCL), but was promoted to the major leagues on April 25 after second baseman Ben Zobrist was placed on the 15-day disabled list. On May 17, 2015, Muncy hit his first major league home run off of Chicago White Sox pitcher Jeff Samardzija. He batted .206 in 45 games for Oakland in 2015. He split the 2016 season between Nashville and Oakland, batting .186 in 51 major league games in 2016. The Athletics released Muncy toward the end of spring training in 2017.

Los Angeles Dodgers
Muncy signed a minor league contract with the Los Angeles Dodgers on April 27, 2017, and the organization assigned him to the Oklahoma City Dodgers of the PCL. In 109 games, he hit .309 with 12 homers and 44 RBIs.

2018: Breakout season
Muncy was called up to the Dodgers on April 17, 2018. He hit his 20th home run for the Dodgers in his 183rd at bat, setting a franchise record. Muncy was chosen as a candidate for the All-Star Final Vote for the 2018 MLB All-Star Game, but he finished in third place in the voting. He also accepted an offer to participate in the Home Run Derby during the All-Star break. After beating Javier Báez in the first round of the Derby, he lost to eventual champion Bryce Harper in the semi-finals.

Muncy batted .263 and led the Dodgers in home runs and was fifth in the National League with 35. He was second in runs batted in for the Dodgers with 79, despite only playing in 137 games. Muncy also exhibited his versatility as he started games at first base (58), third base (30) and second base (13) and also played six games in the outfield. In the playoffs, he hit only .182 in both the Division Series and the National League Championship Series, though he did hit two home runs in the Division Series against the Atlanta Braves.

In the third game of 2018 World Series against the Boston Red Sox, Muncy scored the tying run in the 13th inning and then hit a walk-off home run in the 18th, concluding the longest game in World Series history after seven hours and 20 minutes. In the five games of the series, he hit .235 (four hits in 17 at-bats) with the one home run.

2019: First all-star appearance
In 2019, Muncy was selected to the 2019 Major League Baseball All-Star Game as an injury replacement, his first all-star appearance, replacing Washington Nationals third baseman Anthony Rendon. On August 30, 2019, Muncy was placed on injured list with a wrist fracture. He finished the 2019 regular season, playing in 142 games, hitting .251/.374/.515 with 35 home runs (for the second season in a row) and a career-high 98 RBIs. Muncy also received two MVP votes.

2020: World Series championship
On February 6, 2020, the Dodgers and Muncy agreed to a three-year, $26 million contract extension with a $13 million option for a fourth year. The 2020 season was delayed due to the COVID-19 pandemic in North America. Muncy played in 58 of the Dodgers' 60 games and hit .192/.331/.389 with 12 homers and 27 RBIs. In Game 3 of the 2020 NLCS, Muncy hit a grand slam off of Grant Dayton, capping off scoring 11 runs in the first inning. Eventually the Dodgers broke the record in that game hitting 5 home runs. They won 15–3 as they won the NLCS in seven games against the Atlanta Braves before advancing to the World Series for the third time in four years. In the 2020 World Series, he batted .318 with one home run and six RBIs and helped the Dodgers win the championship.

2021: 100 career home runs and second all-star appearance
On May 30, 2021, Muncy hit his 100th career home run off of Zack Littell of the San Francisco Giants. In July, he was selected to represent the Dodgers at the All-Star Game. Muncy finished the 2021 season batting .249/.368/.527 with 36 home runs and 94 RBIs. In the final game of the regular season, Muncy dislocated his elbow when Jace Peterson of the Milwaukee Brewers collided with his arm while he was attempting to field the ball at first base, making him unavailable for the playoffs.

2022
On August 22, 2022, Muncy signed a one-year contract extension worth $13.5 million for the 2023 season, which also included a $10 million club option for 2024, with incentives. He played in 136 games in 2022, with most of his starts at third base after the team acquired Freddie Freeman to play first. He hit a career low .196 with 21 homers and 69 RBIs.

Personal life
Muncy and his wife, Kellie, married in November 2018. They welcomed a daughter in July 2021.

See also

 List of Baylor University people
 List of people from Midland, Texas

References

External links

Baylor Bears bio

1990 births
Living people
Baseball players from Texas
Baylor Bears baseball players
Burlington Bees players
Los Angeles Dodgers players
Major League Baseball first basemen
Major League Baseball second basemen
Major League Baseball third basemen
Mesa Solar Sox players
Midland RockHounds players
Nashville Sounds players
National League All-Stars
Oakland Athletics players
Oklahoma City Dodgers players
People from Tarrant County, Texas
Stockton Ports players
Wareham Gatemen players